Mathias Sjöberg (born September 15, 1988, in Finja) is a Swedish ice hockey player. He is currently playing with the Tyringe SOS in the Swedish Division 2.

He has played in the Swedish Elitserien with Rögle BK, but decided to move back home and play in a lower division because he missed doing things like fishing and hunting that he did not have time to do while playing in a high division.

He has also played hockey in Frölunda J20.

References

External links

1988 births
Living people
Rögle BK players
Swedish ice hockey defencemen